Georgi Zaychev (born 25 March 1933) is a Bulgarian wrestler. He competed in the men's freestyle lightweight at the 1956 Summer Olympics.

References

External links
 

1933 births
Living people
Bulgarian male sport wrestlers
Olympic wrestlers of Bulgaria
Wrestlers at the 1956 Summer Olympics
Place of birth missing (living people)